The Farmers Insurance Open is a professional golf tournament on the PGA Tour, played in the San Diego, California, area in the early part of the season known as the "West Coast Swing".

The tournament was noted for having singer-actor Andy Williams as a celebrity host from 1968 through 1988. It originated as the San Diego Open in 1952 and used that name in its title through 1985. Title sponsors were added in 1981, first with Wickes for two years, then three with Isuzu. Shearson Lehman Brothers became the title sponsors in 1986, replaced by Buick in 1992 and Farmers Insurance in 2010. The event is organized by The Century Club of San Diego.

Although the San Diego Open began in 1952, the PGA Tour recognizes two earlier events of the same name: Leo Diegel won both events, in December 1927 and January 1929. It was an autumn event in 1956 and 1957, not held in 1958, and returned as a winter event in early 1959.

Course history
Founded  in 1952, the first two editions were played at San Diego Country Club in Chula Vista. In 1954, the San Diego Open was at Rancho Santa Fe Golf Club, which had hosted the Crosby Pro-Am prior to World War II.

The event was played at Mission Valley Country Club in San Diego in 1955, then went to Singing Hills Country Club in El Cajon in October 1956. The tournament returned to Mission Valley C.C. in 1957, where it stayed through 1963. Mission Valley changed its name to Stardust Country Club in 1962 (and now is known as Riverwalk Golf Club). After one edition in 1964 at Rancho Bernardo Country Club (now Rancho Bernardo Inn) in San Diego, it returned to Stardust  for three years, through 1967.

In 1968, the event began its present relationship with Torrey Pines Golf Course in La Jolla, a 36-hole public facility owned by the City of San Diego. During those early editions at Torrey Pines, the course length was under . In the current tournament set-up, players split the first 36 holes between the North and South Courses, then play the final 36 holes on the South Course. The South Course has hosted the U.S. Open twice: Tiger Woods won in a playoff in 2008, and Jon Rahm won in 2021.

Winners

Note: Green highlight indicates scoring records.
Sources:

Multiple winners
Through 2023, nine players have won this tournament more than once:

7 wins
Tiger Woods: 1999, 2003, 2005, 2006, 2007, 2008, 2013
3 wins
Phil Mickelson: 1993, 2000, 2001
2 wins
Tommy Bolt: 1953, 1955
Arnold Palmer: 1957, 1961
J. C. Snead: 1975, 1976
Tom Watson: 1977, 1980
Steve Pate: 1988, 1992
Brandt Snedeker: 2012, 2016
Jason Day: 2015, 2018

Records and trivia
Tournament course record:
 Torrey Pines, North Course - 61, Mark Brooks, 1990, and Brandt Snedeker, 2007; 
 Torrey Pines, South Course - 62, Tiger Woods, 1999
Tiger Woods is the only seven-time winner of the tournament, and Phil Mickelson the only other to win more than twice. 
Hall of Famer and San Diego native Gene Littler is the only amateur winner, achieving the feat in 1954, and awarded a five-piece tea set. Subsequently, as a professional, Littler was a runner-up three times (1969, 1974, 1978). 
A memorable year in the tournament's history was 1982, when Johnny Miller outdueled Jack Nicklaus to win by one stroke.
Tiger Woods (2005–08) won four straight years, then won his fifth consecutive Torrey Pines tournament at the 2008 U.S. Open on the South Course that June.
J. C. Snead (1975–76) and Phil Mickelson (2000–01) won in consecutive years.
Heavyweight boxer Joe Louis was invited to play in the San Diego Open in 1952 on a sponsor's exemption;
Louis became the first African American ever to play in this PGA Tour event.

Notes

References

External links

Coverage on the PGA Tour's official site

PGA Tour events
Golf in California
Sports competitions in San Diego
Recurring sporting events established in 1952
1952 establishments in California